Lemony Snicket's A Series of Unfortunate Events is the soundtrack on the Sony Classical label of the 2004 Lemony Snicket's A Series of Unfortunate Events, starring Jim Carrey, Meryl Streep, Catherine O'Hara, Billy Connolly, Liam Aiken, and Emily Browning. The original score was composed by Thomas Newman.

The album was nominated for the Academy Award for Best Original Score.

Many of the tracks from the soundtrack were used in the 2007 documentary Sicko.

Track listing

See also 

 Lemony Snicket's A Series of Unfortunate Events

References 

2004 soundtrack albums
2000s film soundtrack albums
Sony Classical Records soundtracks
A Series of Unfortunate Events
Thomas Newman albums